Lagomarsino is a surname. Notable people with the surname include:

 Diego Lagomarsino, a suspect in the death of Alberto Nisman case in Argentina
Nancy Lagomarsino, American poet
Robert J. Lagomarsino (born 1926), American politician
Ron Lagomarsino, American film, theatre and television director